Eliud Poligrates is a Filipino professional basketball player.

He was drafted 27th overall in the 2013 PBA draft by Talk 'N Text Tropang Texters.

Amateur career
Eliud was brought in by Southwestern University scouts after he was discovered playing in small leagues in his hometown of Camotes Island – a group of islands that form part of the province of Cebu. But his flourishing three-year career at Southwestern came to an abrupt end in 2009 when he was caught – ironically – moonlighting in a small league in the province or larong labas. The offense led to a lifetime ban from the Cebu Schools Athletic Foundation Inc. (CESAFI).

The CESAFI ban led Poligrates to bounce from one Cebu commercial team to another, suiting up for M. Lhuillier, Mandaue Landmasters, and MisOr Meteors in Liga Pilipinas. Then came the chance to play in Manila and join Cagayan Valley in the PBA D-League after Rising Suns officials spotted him playing - to no one's surprise - in another larong-labas.

Professional career
Poligrates scored 13 points in his PBA debut against the Meralco Bolts in his home province in Cebu.

Shortly before the end of 2013–14 PBA Philippine Cup eliminations, he was traded along with Sean Anthony a 2010 first-round pick to Air21 Express in exchange for Niño Canaleta, who went to Talk 'N Text Tropang Texters.

On November 27, 2014, he was again traded to Kia Sorento in exchange for Rudy Lingganay.

On 2015, Poligrates was signed by Cafe France Bakers of the PBA Developmental League (PBA D-League). In June 2015, Poligrates led the Bakers to its first PBA D-League title over favorites Hapee Fresh Fighters in the 2015 PBA D-League Foundation Cup.

In April 2015, Poligrates was signed by Euro-Med of the Pilipinas Commercial Basketball League (PCBL) after a six-month absence from commercial basketball. In his debut with the team, he scored 17 points against Foton Tornadoes.

PBA career statistics

Correct as of October 11, 2015

Season-by-season averages

|-
| align=left | 
| align=left | Talk 'N Text / Air21
| 33 || 12.2 || .415 || .273 || .533 || 1.5 || .7 || .2 || .0 || 4.2
|-
| align=left | 
| align=left | Kia
| 11 || 13.5 || .340 || .160 || .667 || 1.5 || 1.4 || .4 || .0 || 3.8
|-
| align=left | Career
| align=left |
| 44 || 12.5 || .394 || .237 || .556 || 1.5 || .9 || .3 || .0 || 4.1

Personal life
Poligrates lives in Metro Manila with his family, as featured in an episode of the GMA Network TV show Kapuso Mo, Jessica Soho. The episode, entitled "Idol sa Hardcourt," aired on 16 March 2014.

References

1987 births
Living people
Air21 Express players
Basketball players from Cebu
Cebuano people
Filipino men's basketball players
Terrafirma Dyip players
Point guards
TNT Tropang Giga players
TNT Tropang Giga draft picks